Lajos Drahos (7 March 1895 – 2 June 1983) was a Hungarian  Communist politician, who served as Speaker of the National Assembly of Hungary between 1949 and 1951. He was the ambassador to Poland from May 1951 to his retirement (1955). He was unsuitable for his position, because he did not speak any foreign languages, and was unprepared and inexperienced in diplomacy. A single viewpoint controlled the Communist decision makers at the time of their selection: reliability.

References

1895 births
1983 deaths
Politicians from Budapest
People from the Kingdom of Hungary
Hungarian Communist Party politicians
Members of the Hungarian Working People's Party
Members of the Hungarian Socialist Workers' Party
Speakers of the National Assembly of Hungary
Members of the National Assembly of Hungary (1945–1947)
Members of the National Assembly of Hungary (1947–1949)
Members of the National Assembly of Hungary (1949–1953) 
Ambassadors of Hungary to Poland